Mangalpur is a village in Chitwan District in the Bagmati Province of southern Nepal. It was also a Village Development committee before it merged with Bharatpur. At the time of the 1991 Nepal census it had a population of 12,969 people residing in 2,580 individual households.

Location
It lies 7 km west from the headquarters of the district. Narayani River flows on its northern part.

References

Populated places in Chitwan District